Princess and the Pea is a children's board game loosely based on "The Princess and the Pea", an 1835 fairy tale by Hans Christian Andersen, in which each player tries to build the highest stack of mattresses before reaching the final space on the board. It was first published by Winning Moves Games USA in 2003 and was republished in 2008 - but is no longer in production.

Gameplay 
The gameplay is fairly straightforward.  On a player's turn, the roll the die and move their bed forward that many spaces on the board, then perform the action of the space they land on.  Actions involve adding mattresses to your bed from the supply, giving away a mattress, taking a mattress from the person with the most, etc.  The game ends when one of the players reaches the crown space, the last one on the board.  All other players move their beds to the space and the number of mattresses each player has is counted.  The player with the most wins.  In the case of a tie, the win is shared.

External links 
 

Board games introduced in 2003
Children's games
Works based on The Princess and the Pea